Artak Ghulyan (December 28, 1958), is an Armenian architect and designer, Doctor of Architecture, Docent (Associate professor),  and professor of the International Academy of Architecture. In September 2013, he received the title of "Honored Architect of the Republic of Armenia". In December 2013, he received the "State Prize of the Republic of Armenia" for the design of the Vatche and Tamar Manoukian Manuscript Library building at the Mother See of Holy Etchmiadzin.

Ghulyan is an author of many civil buildings and monuments, but his fame is mainly based on his evolutionary designs of new Armenian churches.

Life and education
Artak Ghulyan was born in 1958 in Gyulistan village of the Shahumyan Region, a majority-Armenian administrative unit outside the Nagorno-Karabakh Autonomous Oblast, within the Azerbaijan Soviet Socialist Republic, USSR. His parents were teachers at the school of the village.

After completing his secondary education in his native village with honorary degrees in 1976, Ghulyan moved to Yerevan to study architecture at the National University of Architecture and Construction of Armenia, known as the Karl Marx Institute of Polytechnic during the Soviet period. He was graduated from the university in 1981.

Between 1981 and 1988 Ghulyan has worked as an assistant lecturer in the Faculty of Architecture of the Polytechnic Institute, teaching the basics of architectural design. Between 1988 and 1991 he was employed by the Art Institute of the Armenian National Academy of Sciences to work at the Department of Architecture. Between 1991 and 1994, Ghulyan has worked as the chief of the Department of Medieval Monuments of the Board of Monuments Preservation of the Republic of Armenia. In 1994, he became a senior co-worker of the National Academy's art institute. Between 1988 and 2010, Ghulyan concurrently worked as a teacher in the Faculty of Architetc of the National University of Architecture and Construction of Armenia lecturing the theory of architect and about the restoration of historic monuments. In 2002, Ghulyan became a Docent (Associate professor), and later in 2006 he received his PhD degree in architecture from the University of Architecture and Construction of Armenia.
Artak Ghulyan is married to Hasmik Stepanyan who is a graduate of the Yerevan Brusov State University of Languages and Social Sciences. The couple has 2 children.

National awards
In September 2013, Ghulyan received the title of "Honored Architect of the Republic of Armenia" by a decree issued by then-president Serzh Sargsyan. In December of the same year, president Serzh Sargsyan honored him with the "State Prize of the Republic of Armenia" in the field of urban development and architecture, for the design of the Vatche and Tamar Manoukian Manuscript Library building in Etchmiadzin.

Works and designs

Artak Ghulyan has designed many Armenian churches throughout Armenia as well as the Armenian diaspora. His notable works include:
Vatche and Tamar Manoukian Manuscript Library of the Mother See of Holy Etchmiadzin, Vagharshapat, opened in October 2012.
Saint John the Baptist Church, Abovyan, opened in May 2013.
Armenian Monastery Complex of Moscow: Holy Transfiguration Cathedral and the Church of the Holy Cross, opened in September 2013.
Surp Hovhannes Church, Berd, opened in September 2014.
Surp Karapet Church, near Jordan River, Jordan, opened in October 2014.
Church of the Holy Archangels, Sevan, opened in March 2015.
Church of the Holy Martyrs in Nubarashen, Yerevan, opened in April 2015.
Surp Hovhannes Church, Artashat, opened in May 2015.
Church of the Holy Saviour, Nor Hachn, opened in July 2015.
Eurnekian School of the Mother See of Holy Etchmiadzin, Vagharshapat, opened in September 2017.
Holy Cross Church of Arabkir District, Yerevan, opened in April 2018.
Quba Mere Diwane Yazidi Temple, Aknalich, opened in September 2019

Projected works
Mesrop Mashtots Church in Erebuni, Yerevan, construction in progress.
Armenian church complex, Cherepovets, construction in progress.
Armenian church, Surgut, construction in progress.
Church of the Holy Martyrs in Shengavit, Yerevan, awarded.

References

External links

 Artak Ghulyan biography

1958 births
20th-century Armenian architects
21st-century Armenian architects
Armenian architects
Living people